"Gym and Tonic" is a single released by British production duo Spacedust. The song was originally recorded by French record producer Bob Sinclar as "Gym Tonic", with co-production by Thomas Bangalter and a 12-minute section of improvised funk by James Andrew (Gym) Dakin. The track was included on Sinclar's album Paradise. Their version sampled "Arms", a workout recording by American actress Jane Fonda. However, Fonda refused clearance of her vocals being used as a sample, which eventually led to a single never being released (although the track was released on Bob Sinclar's debut album, as this is how Fonda found out about it). When Spacedust recorded their version of the track, the Fonda vocal samples were re-recorded with a session vocalist.

Released on 12 October 1998, the song peaked at  1 on the UK Singles Chart; however, it was the lowest-selling UK number-one song of 1998, selling only 66,000 copies during its opening week. Despite this, it received a silver certification from the British Phonographic Industry for shipments exceeding 200,000 copies the same year. It also reached No. 10 in Iceland and New Zealand, No. 17 in Ireland, and the top 40 in Belgium (Flanders and Wallonia).

Music video
The music video for Spacedust's track depicts an exercise workout filmed on 2 August 1998 and featured an appearance by Nancy Sorrell. In an ode to exercise videos from the 1980s and 1990s, it was intentionally cheaply made with production costs for the video at over £10,000. It regularly features on VH1's "worst videos" lists.

Track listings
UK, European and Australian CD single
 "Gym and Tonic" (radio) – 3:19
 "Gym and Tonic" (original mix) – 7:18
 "Spacegroove" – 6:29

UK cassette single
 "Gym and Tonic" (radio) – 3:19
 "Spacegroove"– 6:29

Charts and certifications

Weekly charts

Year-end charts

Certifications

References

1998 debut singles
East West Records singles
UK Singles Chart number-one singles
1998 songs